Birgir Leifur Hafþórsson (born 16 May 1976) is an Icelandic professional golfer and former European Tour player. At age 41, he became Iceland's first winner on the Challenge Tour, winning the 2017 Cordon Golf Open in France. He also won the mixed team gold and the men's silver at the 2018 European Golf Team Championships at Gleneagles, Scotland.

Early life and amateur career
Hafþórsson was born in Akranes, Iceland, and took up golf with a group of friends when he was 12. His uncle Sveinn Arsalsson was the first National Champion of Iceland.

He first won the Icelandic National Golf Championship as an amateur in 1996, and would go on to win also in 2003, 2004 and 2010.

Professional career
Hafþórsson turned professional in 1997 and joined the Swedish Golf Tour. He attended the European Tour Qualifying School 18 times between 1997 and 2016, and was successful in 2006 and 2007, the other years playing with limited status, mainly on the Challenge Tour.

Hafþórsson joined the European Tour in 2007 after taking the 25th card at Q-School. His best finish in his rookie season was a tie for 11th at the Telecom Italia Open, 3 strokes behind winner Gonzalo Fernández-Castaño. He finished in 12th place at Q-School to keep his card, but he sustained a debilitating injury to his lower back in 2008. He suffered from spondylolisthesis, a condition in which a defect in a part of the spine causes vertebra to slip, and played the European Tour on a medical extension in 2009.

Playing mainly on the Challenge Tour from 2011, he finished 3rd at the 2011 Mugello Tuscany Open, and won the 2017 Cordon Golf Open in France by a convincing 7 strokes. At age 41, he became Iceland's first winner on the Challenge Tour.

Hafþórsson represented Iceland at the 2018 European Golf Team Championships at Gleneagles, Scotland. He won the team gold together with Ólafía Þórunn Kristinsdóttir, Valdis Thora Jonsdottir and Axel Bóasson, and silver behind Spain in the men's event with Axel Bóasson.

Professional wins (5)

Challenge Tour wins (1)

*Note: The 2017 Cordon Golf Open was shortened to 54 holes due to rain.

Other wins (4)
1996 Icelandic National Golf Championship (as an amateur)
2003 Icelandic National Golf Championship
2004 Icelandic National Golf Championship
2010 Icelandic National Golf Championship

Source:

Team appearances
Professional
European Championships (representing Iceland): 2018 (winner – mixed team)

See also
 2006 European Tour Qualifying School graduates
 2007 European Tour Qualifying School graduates

References

External links
 
 

Icelandic male golfers
European Tour golfers
People from Akranes
1976 births
Living people